Sergey Yuryevich Ageyev (born 12 November 1968) is a Russian professional football official and a former player. He currently works as an administrator for FC Tom Tomsk.

Club career
He made his Russian Football National League debut for FC Tom Tomsk on 29 March 1998 in a game against FC Anzhi Makhachkala. He played 4 seasons in the FNL for Tom.

External links
 

1968 births
Living people
Soviet footballers
Russian footballers
FC Dynamo Barnaul players
FC Tom Tomsk players
Association football forwards